HNoMS Rauma was an Otra-class minesweeper built in 1939 for the Royal Norwegian Navy. Captured by the Germans during the 1940 invasion of Norway and renamed Kamerun, she was returned to the Norwegians after the end of the Second World War and recommissioned in 1947. Rauma remained in service until being sold for scrapping in 1963.

Description
As the threat of war in Europe became ever more clear the decision was made to improve the Royal Norwegian Navy's mine warfare capabilities. At first a number of 2. class gunboats were rebuilt into minelayers and minesweepers, but with war looming it soon became clear that more capable vessels were required. Thus, two new purpose-built minesweepers were constructed at Nylands Verksted in Oslo; Otra and Rauma. Both ships were completed and commissioned only a short time before the German invasion of Norway. Otra class vessels used the Oropesa system of minesweeping.

The invasion

Prelude
Shortly before the German invasion the UK announced that the Royal Navy had laid out a number of minefields along the coast of Norway to interfere with the German import of Swedish iron ore through the North Norwegian port of Narvik. The British government claimed to have mined three areas; off Stad, Hustadvika, and Landegode north of Bodø. In response to this report, the Norwegian government ordered the minesweepers Otra and Rauma to sail north from their base in Horten and sweep the minefields on 9 April 1940.

The invasion force is spotted
Before the order to go north could be carried out, however, the German invasion of Norway began in the early hours of 9 April. As reports of intruding warships started coming in Otra was sent out to investigate, and at 0410hrs reported that the intruders were German. The invasion flotilla blocked Otras return to Horten.

Battle of Horten harbour

An important part of the Germans' plan to invade Norway was the seizure of the Royal Norwegian Navy's main naval base at Horten in the Oslofjord. A force consisting of the R boats R.17 and R.27 and the torpedo boats Albatros and Kondor entered Horten harbour at 0435 hrs, shortly after the invasion was identified by Otra. Defending the naval base was Rauma and the minelayer HNoMS Olav Tryggvason. Rauma charged the enemy vessels with her single 76 mm gun and two machine guns, succeeding in helping Olav Tryggvason sink R.17 and force a damaged Albatros to flee the area. However, despite the intense fire from the two Norwegian warships, R.27 managed to land a small force of infantry in the harbour before running aground after repeated hits. While running the gauntlet between the Norwegian ships R.27 returned fire and hit Rauma repeatedly, severely damaging the minesweeper and killing her commander, Lieutenant Ingolf Carl Winsnes, and a sailor, as well as wounding six others. Only eight crew members remained unwounded. At 0735hrs, after threats of aerial bombardment of the naval base and the city right next to it, as well as a misguided impression of the size of the German landing force, the Norwegian forces at Horten surrendered.

German service as Kamerun
After the German capture of Horten the surrendered Norwegian vessels were pressed into Kriegsmarine service. Rauma was repaired and recommissioned as Kamerun on 18 April 1940. Kamerun first served as a Vorpostenboot in the Hafenschutzflotille Oslo, later being converted into a minelayer. Kamerun spent her entire war in Norway and was part of the German Mine Sweeping Administration (GM-SA) after the German surrender in 1945.

Post-war service
After the war Rauma was recommissioned in 1947 and in 1949 was rebuilt as a minelayer training ship. She was decommissioned in Horten 21 August 1959 and laid up until put out of service and sold in April 1963.

Footnotes

Bibliography
 
 

Naval ships of Norway captured by Germany during World War II
Training ships of the Royal Norwegian Navy
Ships built in Oslo
Minesweepers of the Royal Norwegian Navy
Minelayers of the Royal Norwegian Navy
World War II minesweepers of Norway
1939 ships